Decimus Carfulenus, called Carsuleius by Appianus, was a Roman statesman from the time of the Civil War to the Battle of Mutina, in which he perished.

Biography
Carfulenus served under Caesar in the Alexandrine War, B.C. 47.  Hirtius describes him as a man of great military skill.

At the time of Caesar's murder in 44 B.C., Carfulenus was tribune of the plebs.  He was a supporter of the aristocratic party, and an opponent of Marcus Antonius, the general of Caesar.  When Antonius summoned the senate to the Capitol on November 28, in order to have Caesar's nephew, Octavianus, declared an enemy of the state, Carfulenus and his colleagues, Tiberius Canutius and Lucius Cassius Longinus, were excluded from the Capitol, so that they could not interpose their veto against the senate's decree.

In the following year, Carfulenus took an active part in the war against Antonius.  He fell in the Battle of Mutina, in which Antonius was defeated.

See also
 Carfulena (gens)

Footnotes

1st-century BC Romans